17th Regiment or 17th Infantry Regiment may refer to:

 Royal Leicestershire Regiment, also known as the 17th Leicestershire Regiment of Foot, of the British Army, from 1688 to 1964
 17th Regiment of Light Dragoons (1759) of the British Army, raised in 1759 
 17th Regiment of Light Dragoons (17th Lancers) of the British Army, redesignated as a lancer regiment in 1861
 17th Infantry Regiment (Republic of Korea), a unit of the Republic of Korea Army
 17th Infantry Regiment (United States), a unit of the United States Army
 17th Cavalry Regiment (United States), a unit of the United States Army
 Combat Logistics Regiment 17, a unit of the United States Marine Corps

 American Civil War regiments 
 17th Illinois Volunteer Infantry Regiment
 17th Regiment Illinois Volunteer Cavalry
 17th Indiana Infantry Regiment
 17th Iowa Volunteer Infantry Regiment
 17th Maine Volunteer Infantry Regiment
 17th Michigan Volunteer Infantry Regiment
 17th Wisconsin Volunteer Infantry Regiment

See also
 17th Division (disambiguation)
 17th Brigade (disambiguation)
 17 Squadron (disambiguation)